John Martin is a British former competitive figure skater who competed in men's singles. He is a four-time British national silver medalist and was sent to four European Championships. Martin made his European debut in 1989, placing 19th in Birmingham, England. His best result, 14th, came at the 1993 European Championships in Helsinki, Finland.

Competitive highlights

References 

British male single skaters
Living people
Date of birth missing (living people)
Place of birth missing (living people)
Year of birth missing (living people)